Anthia oberthuri is a species of ground beetle in the subfamily Anthiinae. It was described by Obst in 1906.

References

Anthiinae (beetle)
Beetles described in 1906